Harris Mountain may refer to:

 Harris Mountain (Alabama) in Alabama, USA
 Harris Mountain (Arkansas) in Arkansas, USA
 Harris Mountain (Arizona) in Arizona, USA
 Harris Mountain (California) in California, USA
 Harris Mountain (Georgia) in Georgia, USA
 Harris Mountain (Cascade County, Montana) in Cascade County, Montana, USA
 Harris Mountain (Chouteau County, Montana) in Chouteau County, Montana, USA
 Harris Mountain (Nevada) in Nevada, USA
 Harris Mountain (North Carolina) in North Carolina, USA

See also: Harris Mountains